Hokaito Zhimomi (born 24 September 1986) is an Indian first-classer from Nagaland, who played for Assam and Nagaland. He is from Sangtamtila village of Dimapur district.

He was part of Kolkata Knight Riders in the First edition of IPL, He was never part of the playing 11.

Career
He played his junior and club cricket in Kolkata, representing Dalhousie Athletic Club. He was also a part of the extended IPL team Kolkata Knight Riders in 2009.

Ahead of the 2018–19 Ranji Trophy, he transferred from Assam to Nagaland. He made his List A debut for Nagaland in the 2018–19 Vijay Hazare Trophy on 19 September 2018. He made his Twenty20 debut on 8 November 2019, for Nagaland in the 2019–20 Syed Mushtaq Ali Trophy.

References

External links
 

Indian cricketers
Assam cricketers
1986 births
Living people
People from Dimapur
Naga people
Nagaland cricketers